37519 Amphios  is a Jupiter trojan from the Trojan camp, approximately  in diameter. It was discovered at the Palomar Observatory during the third Palomar–Leiden Trojan survey in 1977. The dark Jovian asteroid is a member of an unnamed asteroid family and has a long rotation period of 50.9 hours. It was named after Amphius from Greek mythology.

Discovery 

Amphios was discovered on 16 October 1977, by Dutch astronomer couple Ingrid and Cornelis van Houten at Leiden, on photographic plates taken by Dutch–American astronomer Tom Gehrels at Palomar Observatory in the Palomar Mountain Range, southeast of Los Angeles. The body's observation arc begins at Palomar just nine days prior to its official discovery observation.

Palomar–Leiden Trojan survey 

The survey designation "T-3" stands for the third and last Palomar–Leiden Trojan survey, which was named after the fruitful collaboration of the Palomar and Leiden Observatory in the 1960s and 1970s. Gehrels used Palomar's Samuel Oschin telescope (also known as the 48-inch Schmidt Telescope), and shipped the photographic plates to Ingrid and Cornelis van Houten at Leiden Observatory where astrometry was carried out. The trio are credited with the discovery of several thousand asteroids.

Naming 

This minor planet was named from Greek mythology after Amphius (Amphios), an ally of King Priam during the Trojan War. Amphius was killed by Ajax, who tried to take his beautiful armor but was prevented in doing so by a mountain of spears. The official naming citation was published by the Minor Planet Center on 18 March 2003.

Orbit and classification 

As all Jupiter trojan, Amphios is in a 1:1 orbital resonance with Jupiter. It is located in the trailering Trojan camp at the Gas Giant's  Lagrangian point, 60° behind its orbit . It orbits the Sun at a distance of 5.2–5.2 AU once every 11 years and 11 months (4,338 days; semi-major axis of 5.21 AU). Its orbit has an eccentricity of 0.01 and an inclination of 25° with respect to the ecliptic.

Jovian family member 

Amphios is member of a small unnamed asteroid family, consisting of 13 known members with an undefined spectral type. The family's unnamed principal body is the Jovian asteroid . The family is one of two Jovian asteroid families in the Trojan camp – the other being the Hippasos family – first described by Jakub Rozehnal and Miroslav Brož in 2014.

In a different application of the hierarchical clustering method by Andrea Milani and Zoran Knežević, Amphios is still considered to be an asteroid of the Jovian background population.

Physical characteristics 

Amphios is an assumed C-type asteroid, while most larger Jupiter trojans are D-types.

Rotation period 

In December 2014, a rotational lightcurve of Amphios was obtained over at total of 13 nights of photometric observations by Robert Stephens at the Center for Solar System Studies in Landers, California. Lightcurve analysis gave a rotation period of  hours with a brightness amplitude of 0.30 magnitude. While not being a slow rotator, Amphios has a significantly longer period than most larger Jupiter trojans (see table below).

Diameter and albedo 

According to the survey carried out by the NEOWISE mission of NASA's Wide-field Infrared Survey Explorer, Amphios measures 33.08 kilometers in diameter and its surface has an albedo of 0.077, while the Collaborative Asteroid Lightcurve Link assumes a standard albedo for a carbonaceous asteroid of 0.057 and calculates a diameter of 35.12 kilometers based on an absolute magnitude of 11.0.

Notes

References

External links 
 Long-term evolution of asteroid families among Jovian Trojans, Jakub Rozehnal and Miroslav Brož (2014)
 Asteroid Lightcurve Database (LCDB), query form (info )
 Dictionary of Minor Planet Names, Google books
 Asteroids and comets rotation curves, CdR – Observatoire de Genève, Raoul Behrend
 Discovery Circumstances: Numbered Minor Planets (35001)-(40000) – Minor Planet Center
 
 

037519
Discoveries by Cornelis Johannes van Houten
Discoveries by Ingrid van Houten-Groeneveld
Discoveries by Tom Gehrels
3040
Named minor planets
19771016